The Towns County School District is a public school district in Towns County, Georgia, United States, based in Hiawassee. It serves the communities of Hiawassee, Tate City, and Young Harris.

Schools
The Towns County School District has one elementary school, one middle school, and one high school.

Elementary schools
Towns County Elementary School

Middle school
Towns County Middle School

High school
Towns County High School

References

External links

School districts in Georgia (U.S. state)
Education in Towns County, Georgia